Atlee High School is a secondary school serving central Hanover County, Virginia located in Mechanicsville, Virginia, United States. Atlee High School is a part of the Hanover County School District.

History
Atlee High School opened in 1991.

Academics
Atlee has been an International Baccalaureate since January, 2000.

Demographics
The demographic breakdown of the 1,677 students that were enrolled in 2014-2015 was:

Male- 51.8%
Female 48.2%
Native American/Alaskan- 0.3%
Asian/Pacific islanders - 2.3%
Black - 7.5%
Hispanic - 3.0%
White - 85.2%
Multiracial - 1.7%

Performing arts
Atlee has three competitive show choirs, the mixed-gender Illusion and the women's-only Elegance and Serenade.

Notable alumni 
Kevin Grubb, NASCAR driver
Wayne Grubb, NASCAR crew chief and former driver
Connor Overton, Major League Baseball relief pitcher for the Toronto Blue Jays
Billy Parker, Arena Football League defensive specialist for the New York Dragons
Zuriel Smith, Dallas Cowboys wide receiver and return specialist

References

External links

Hanover County Public Schools website

Public high schools in Virginia
Educational institutions established in 1991
International Baccalaureate schools in Virginia
Schools in Hanover County, Virginia
1991 establishments in Virginia